The 2003 North Carolina Tar Heels football team represented the University of North Carolina at Chapel Hill as a member of the Atlantic Coast Conference (ACC) during the 2003 NCAA Division I-A football season. Led by third-year head coach John Bunting, the Tar Heels played their home games at Kenan Memorial Stadium in Chapel Hill, North Carolina. North Carolina finished the season 2–10 overall and 1–7 in ACC play to place last out of nine teams.

Schedule

Coaching staff

References

North Carolina
North Carolina Tar Heels football seasons
North Carolina Tar Heels football